Melvin B. Dodge (1924August 19, 1991) was director of the Columbus Recreation and Parks Department and president of the Greater Columbus Convention and Visitors Bureau.

Biography 
In 1951, Dodge graduated from the Ohio State University with a degree in education.

Shortly after graduation, he was hired by the Columbus Recreation and Parks Department to oversee Sunshine Park. Working his way up in the department, he became the director of the department in 1967. As director, he led the development of the Cultural Arts Center and Bicentennial Park. He is also credited with hiring Jack Hanna who brought national recognition to the Columbus Zoo. Starting in 1977, he served on the zoo association's board of trustees and became a member of the Franklin County Executive Board of the Columbus Zoo beginning in 1985. He left the department in 1985 and Sunshine Park was renamed Dodge Park in honor of his service.

In 1985, he became the president of the Greater Columbus Convention & Visitors Bureau until his death in August 1991. As president, he devised the funding for the expansion of the Greater Columbus Convention Center through a hotel-motel tax.

Death and legacy 
Melvin Dodge died on August 19, 1991 after a long illness.

After Dodge's death, the Columbus Zoological Association established the Melvin B. Dodge-Columbus Zoo Educational Scholarship Fund to provide educational scholarships for children whose parents cannot afford the activities. He was inducted into the Columbus Hall of Fame in 1991.

References 

People from Columbus, Ohio
Ohio State University alumni
1991 deaths
1924 births